Pourquoi Israël (Israel, Why) is a 1973 French film directed by Claude Lanzmann in his directorial debut. Premiered just three days after the Yom Kippur War in Israel, the documentary examines life in Israel 25 years after the birth of the state. Lanzmann spends time with, among others, German-Jewish émigrés, intellectuals, dock workers, police, prison inmates, and the newly arrived, surveying life in the new homeland. The title of the film is often incorrectly given as a question "Why Israel?" however, Lanzmann intended it as an answer or an explanation from a collection of viewpoints.

International media attention was caused by an incident in Hamburg, where leftist groups violently prevented a showing of the movie in October 2009, claiming the movie took a one-sided Zionist perspective.

References

External links
 http://www.encyclopedia.com/doc/1G2-3406801259.html
 
 http://www.filmreference.com/Directors-Ku-Lu/Lanzmann-Claude.html

French documentary films
Documentary films about Jews and Judaism
1973 films
Films directed by Claude Lanzmann
1973 documentary films
Documentary films about Israel
Zionism
Italian documentary films
1970s Italian films
1970s French films